Gregory Eskin (born 5 December 1936) is a Russian-Israeli-American mathematician, specializing in partial differential equations.

Eskin received in 1963 his Ph.D. (Russian candidate's degree) from Moscow State University with thesis advisor Georgiy Shilov. In 1974 Eskin immigrated with his family to Israel and became a professor at the Hebrew University of Jerusalem. In 1983 he was an invited speaker at the International Congress of Mathematicians at Warsaw. In 1982 he with his family emigrated from Israel to the USA and he became a professor at UCLA. He was elected a Fellow of the American Mathematical Society in 2014.

He is married to Marina Eskin, also a mathematician. Their son Alex is a professor of mathematics at the University of Chicago, their other son Eleazar is a professor of computer science and human genetics at UCLA, and their daughter Ascia is a researcher in the Department of Human Genetics, David Geffen UCLA School of Medicine.

Selected publications

Articles
with Marko Iosifovich Vishik:

Books
 Краевые задачи для эллиптических псевдодифференциальных уравнений (Boundary problems for elliptic pseudodifferential equations) М.: Наука, (Moscow, Nauka) 1973. — 232 p.
 Boundary Value Problems for Elliptic Pseudodifferential Equations. American Mathematical Society, 2008. — 375 p.
 Lectures on Linear Partial Differential Equations. American Mathematical Society, 2011. — 410 p.

References

1936 births
Living people
Scientists from Kyiv
American people of Russian-Jewish descent
Soviet mathematicians
Israeli mathematicians
20th-century American mathematicians
21st-century American mathematicians
PDE theorists
Moscow State University alumni
Academic staff of the Hebrew University of Jerusalem
University of California, Los Angeles faculty
Fellows of the American Mathematical Society